Deep Forest is an album by Do As Infinity which was released in 2001.

Track listing

Chart positions

External links
 Deep Forest at Avex Network
 Deep Forest at Oricon

2001 albums
Do As Infinity albums
Avex Group albums
Albums produced by Seiji Kameda